Kurt Wagenseil (Munich, 26 April 1904 - Tutzing, 14 December 1988) was a German translator, essayist and editor.

Biography
After attending high school Wagenseil worked in an art gallery in Berlin. He frequently travelled to Paris and Berlin; this way he became acquainted with several prominent writers, such as Henry Miller, who granted him the right to translate his work.

In 1935 Wagenseil was interned in Dachau concentration camp for bringing to Germany an antifascist book. Thanks to his friendship with British politician Harold Nicolson he was released. Until the end of World War II Wagenseil lived in Tutzing near Starnberger See, where he worked at a publishing company.

He translated over 150 books into German, including the work of several important English-language writers: George Orwell's Nineteen Eighty-Four, Kurt Vonnegut's Slaughterhouse-Five, and many works by Henry Miller, William Somerset Maugham, Victoria Sackville-West and Virginia Woolf. He also translated from French the work of his friends Jean Cocteau, André Gide and André Maurois.

References

External links
 Kurt Wagenseil, the man who brought Henry Miller to Germany

1904 births
1988 deaths
Writers from Munich
English–German translators
Dachau concentration camp survivors
20th-century German translators
20th-century German male writers
German male non-fiction writers